Darklands is the second studio album by Scottish alternative rock band the Jesus and Mary Chain, released on 31 August 1987 by Blanco y Negro Records. The album is the band's first to use drum machines, replacing live drummer Bobby Gillespie, who had left to pursue a career as the frontman of Primal Scream. Lead vocals are performed by Jim Reid, with the exception of "Darklands", "Nine Million Rainy Days" and "On the Wall", which are sung by William Reid.

Darklands reached number five on the UK Albums Chart, the band's highest-peaking album on the chart to date. The album was included in the book 1001 Albums You Must Hear Before You Die.

Primal Scream later recorded a cover version of the album's title track as a B-side to their 1998 single "If They Move, Kill 'Em".

Track listing

2011 expanded edition

Personnel
Credits adapted from the liner notes of Darklands.

The Jesus and Mary Chain
 Jim Reid – vocals 
 William Reid – vocals ; production

Additional personnel
 Bill Price – production 
 John Loder – production 
 Tony Harris – engineering 
 Tim Broad – video photography
 John Maybury – video photography
 Helen Backhouse – design
 Andrew Catlin – photography

Charts

Certifications

References

External links

 Darklands (Adobe Flash) at Radio3Net (streamed copy where licensed)

1987 albums
Albums produced by Bill Price (record producer)
Blanco y Negro Records albums
The Jesus and Mary Chain albums